AEK Athletic Club was one of the first Greek clubs to found a youth academy back in 1934, while AEK Athens Football Club have managed them since 1979.

History

AEK Athletic Club was one of the first Greek clubs to found a youth academy back in 1934.

Famous players have been produced by AEK youth development system over the years.

Some of the most notable include: Tryfon Tzanetis (1933–1950), Kleanthis Maropoulos (1934–1952), Andreas Stamatiadis (1950–1969), Stelios Skevofilakas (1960–1973), Spyros Pomonis (1961–1973), Giorgos Karafeskos (1963–1974), Nikos Karoulias (1973–1974), Spyros Ikonomopoulos (1978–1994), Stelios Manolas (1978–1998), Vangelis Vlachos (1979–1985), Lysandros Georgamlis (1979–1986), Pantelis Konstantinidis (1993–1994), Dionysis Chiotis (1995–1998, 2000–2007), Sokratis Papastathopoulos (2005–2008), Savvas Gentsoglou (2006–2012), Panagiotis Tachtsidis (2007–2010), Kostas Manolas (2009–2012), Victor Klonaridis (2010–2012, 2017–2020) and Kostas Galanopoulos (2015–).

AEK Athens U19 squad
AEK Athens U19 is the youth team of AEK. They participate in the Super League U19 championship. They play their home games at the OPAP Sports Centre in Spata.
 P.  Players with professional contract.
 

AEK Athens U19 Staff
Head coach: Gennaios Karachalios
Physical trainer: Angelos Konstantopoulos
Goalkeeping coach: Panagiotis Ikonomou

AEK Athens U17 squad
 

AEK Athens U17 Staff
Head coach: Petros Tasounidis
Physical trainer: Georgios Papaleontiou
Goalkeeping coach: Athanasios Paraschoudis

Notable players

Notable players coming from the club's youth departments include:
Christos Aravidis
Dionysis Chiotis
Lysandros Georgamlis
Savvas Gentsoglou
Victor Klonaridis
Pantelis Konstantinidis
Kostas Manolas
Stelios Manolas
Kleanthis Maropoulos
Sokratis Papastathopoulos
Michalis Pavlis
Andreas Stamatiadis
Stelios Skevofilakas
Panagiotis Tachtsidis
Tryfon Tzanetis
Vangelis Vlachos

Personnel

Academies staff

References

External links
AEK Academies

AEK Athens F.C.
Football academies in Greece
UEFA Youth League teams